Dr. Michael Jeyakumar Devaraj (Tamil: மைக்கல் ஜெயகுமார்) (born 28 March 1955) is a Malaysian politician and currently as the chairperson of Socialist Party of Malaysia. He served in the Parliament of Malaysia as Member of Parliament for the Sungai Siput constituency in Perak from 2008 to 2018.

Jeyakumar is a prominent member of the Socialist Party of Malaysia (PSM) but was elected to Parliament on the ticket of the People's Justice Party (PKR) in the Pakatan Rakyat (PR) opposition coalition. His win in the 2008 general election unseated Samy Vellu; the long-serving President of the Malaysian Indian Congress (MIC). Samy Vellu had previously defeated Jeyakumar in Sungai Siput in the 1999 and 2004 general elections. Jeyakumar successfully retained his seat in the 2013 general election. However, he contested under PSM's own ticket and lost his seat in the 2018 general election, garnering just 3.52% of the votes cast and losing his deposit.

Detention under Emergency Ordinance
In the run-up to Bersih 2.0 rally for electoral reform in Malaysia, Jeyakumar and other PSM members were arrested in June 2011, accused of trying to wage war against the king and revive Communism. In July 2011, he was arrested under the Emergency Ordinance (EO), which allows for indefinite detention without trial.  He remained in solitary confinement until July 2011, spending a total of 28 days in detention. Jeyakumar credits his release to the support of the people.

Personal life
Jeyakumar also practices as a medical doctor by profession.

Election results

Note: 1 & 2 Michael Jeyakumar Devaraj is a member of PSM, amid contested under the tickets of DAP in the 1999 election and PKR in the 2004, 2008 and 2013 elections.

See also
Sungai Siput (federal constituency)

References

1955 births
Living people
People from Johor
Malaysian politicians of Indian descent
Members of the Dewan Rakyat
People's Justice Party (Malaysia) politicians
Socialist Party of Malaysia politicians
Malaysian socialists
21st-century Malaysian politicians